The following is a list of the 17 cantons of the Aube department, in France, following the French canton reorganisation which came into effect in March 2015:

 Aix-Villemaur-Pâlis
 Arcis-sur-Aube
 Bar-sur-Aube
 Bar-sur-Seine
 Brienne-le-Château
 Creney-près-Troyes
 Nogent-sur-Seine
 Les Riceys
 Romilly-sur-Seine
 Saint-André-les-Vergers
 Saint-Lyé
 Troyes-1
 Troyes-2
 Troyes-3
 Troyes-4
 Troyes-5
 Vendeuvre-sur-Barse

References